Nucleotide phosphatase may refer to:
 Purine-nucleoside phosphorylase, an enzyme
 Nucleotidase, an enzyme